Kanad Institute of Engineering and Management abbreviated as KIEM is a private engineering institution in Kolkata, West Bengal, India which offers undergraduate (B.Tech) four-year engineering degree courses in five disciplines. The college is affiliated to Maulana Abul Kalam Azad University of Technology (MAKAUT).

Departments
It was established in 2008 and offers admission to four branches:
 Computer science and engineering 
 Mechanical engineering 
 Civil engineering 
 Electrical engineering

See also
List of institutions of higher education in West Bengal
Education in India
Education in West Bengal

References

External links 
 http://www.kanadinstitute.com/

Engineering colleges in West Bengal
Universities and colleges in Purba Bardhaman district
Colleges affiliated to West Bengal University of Technology
Educational institutions established in 2008
2008 establishments in West Bengal